Xenorhabdus japonica  is a bacterium from the genus of Xenorhabdus  which has been isolated from the nematode Steinernema kushidai in Japan.

References

Further reading

External links
Type strain of Xenorhabdus japonica at BacDive -  the Bacterial Diversity Metadatabase

Bacteria described in 1995